Manorama Six Feet Under is a 2007 Indian thriller film directed and co-written by Navdeep Singh. The film features Abhay Deol, Raima Sen and  Gul Panag in the lead roles. The film released on 21 September 2007. It follows an amateur detective in a small sleepy town from Rajasthan who finds himself caught in a web of lies, deceit and murder. The movie is based on American neo-noir film, Chinatown (1974). The makers of Manorama Six Feet Under acknowledged the inspiration from the original by playing the sequence where Jack Nicholson's character gets his nose slashed on the main character's (Satyaveer) television.

Plot 

The film opens with a narrative about a nondescript town called Lakhot in Rajasthan, India. The narrator is Satyaveer Singh Randhawa, a down-on-his-luck public works engineer. He compares Lakhot – dry, desolate and despondent – to the general downturn in his own life. As he returns to his irritable and nagging wife Nimmi and their young son, we learn that Satyaveer has just been implicated in a small bribery scandal at work. Nimmi broods over how she wishes she had married a richer fellow. Satyaveer, an aspiring writer whose only novel Manorama sank without a trace, laments about how he had once wished to be famous but is now resigned to a banal and unremarkable existence.

They have an unusual visitor that night. A well dressed, affluent woman presents herself as Mrs. P. P. Rathore, the wife of the Irrigation Minister (and former Maharaja) P. P. Rathore (Kulbhushan Kharbanda). She says she is a big fan of Satyaveer's novel. Captivated by the ingenuity of the detective Raghu, the principal character of the novel, she hopes to secure Satyaveer's assistance in applying the same ingenuity to procure photographic evidence of her husband's affair. She pays him an advance and leaves.
Satyaveer accepts the job in spite of Nimmi's reproach. He stealthily stakes out Rathore's manor. He spots another woman visiting Rathore. Rathore rebukes the woman and turns her away. Satyaveer snaps a few pictures of this exchange and hands over the roll to Mrs. Rathore. He also confides in his brother-in-law and best friend, the loutish but generally well-meaning local cop Brij Mohan. Brij finds this all very fishy and advises Satyaveer to take Nimmi on a short vacation.
Strange events happen to Satyaveer. He finds out that the woman who hired him is not Mrs. Rathore; the real Mrs. Late one evening, as Satyaveer returns home after drinks with Brij, he spots the same woman running for her life from people who are out to kill her. She earnestly urges him to remember her real name, Manorama, and that she is 32 years old. The next day's papers report that Manorama committed suicide in connection with her protests against a canal being built through Lakhot. The canal project is sponsored by Rathore.

He decides to investigate further. He finds out that Manorama was connected with a local children's home and lived with a roommate, Sheetal. The roommate is confused and scared. She refuses to talk with Satyaveer. Satyaveer is later set upon by thugs; they turn out to be the same men who chased Manorama on the night of her death, and they want to find out what she told him that night. Satyaveer tells them what was told to him after getting his two fingers broken and his motorbike is stolen. Satyaveer later uncovers that Manorama's death was an accident; she was hit by a truck as she fled her pursuers.

Sheetal calls him. She is still scared but somehow warms to him and asks if she can stay with him for a few days. Seeing as Nimmi has returned to Rohtak (her parents’ house) for Diwali, Satyaveer agrees. Sheetal moves in for a little while. Around this time, Satyaveer attends a rally function with Rathore in attendance. He follows Rathore and discovers that Rathore receives regular medication from a doctor for an unknown ailment. He also spots the woman who visited him on the night Satyaveer took the photos.

He follows the woman and makes contact with her. She lives with the doctor Anil Poddar. She turns out to be Sameera Rathore, the illegitimate daughter of Rathore. She was trying to get Rathore to accept her as a daughter. Satyaveer begins piecing the parts together. However, when Satyaveer visits the doctor, he finds that the doctor and Sameera have both been brutally murdered. There he and Sheetal discuss what to do next and they almost kiss but his wife calls him and he takes her call immediately remembering his marriage. He runs to the children's home where he discovers that Sheetal has actually been dead for around 8–10 days.

Arriving home, he finds that the woman masquerading as Sheetal is neither surprised nor scared. She blames him for the act she had to up (as Sheetal), and she directs him to meet Rathore. Rathore demands the photos. Satyaveer turns over the photos he had taken. Not surprisingly, Rathore is not the least bit interested in photos of him having an argument with his biological daughter. It turns out that Neetu (the girl pretending to be Sheetal) is a concubine for Rathore. Rathore now openly threatens him and asks that he hand over those photos. Satyaveer returns home. He scans one of the photos he had taken and suddenly finds a clue in it. This clue leads him to what Manorama had said to him on the night she died. The clue was that Manorama from his book died at page 32. He uses the clues to land up in the room of a small hotel in town, where he discovers a shocking set of photos in a packet cached behind the light switchboard.

Satyaveer returns to confront Rathore. He presents the shocking evidence he has found. Rathore was a pedophile. The children's home was his steady supply of (orphaned) children. The real Sheetal and Manorama, who worked at the orphanage, had realized his wicked activities. They were about to blow his cover and hence he had them silenced. Rathore calmly informs Satyaveer that Satyaveer, smart though he may be, is still a small-town man that may easily be dispensed with. He then has Neetu harass him sexually which makes Satyaveer come out of disgust and he sees the goons dismantling his scooter. Satyaveer then comes back and reveals another fact. The doctor, Anil Potdar and Manorama were siblings. Also, though the doctor knew that Rathore had lung cancer, he kept concealing the fact from him and kept giving him placebos merely to suppress the symptoms of cancer. The doctor and Manorama merely wanted to keep him alive long enough for him to accept Sameera as his daughter and heir. Then, on Rathore's eventual death, the estate would come to Sameera and thus also to the doctor and Manorama. It was now too late since cancer had reached an advanced stage and Rathore had precious little time left to live. Hearing this Rathore's wife laughs with great relief.

As Satyaveer is walking out, one of the goons, who is asthmatic, starts choking on a peanut, but he continues walking by carefree. He remarks that big fish doesn't always win, small fish does manage to get out and sometimes a bigger fish comes along to take over. He gets away in the pink taxi and reunites with his wife and son at the terminal.

Cast

Critical reception 
The film received mostly positive reviews from critics. Raja Sen of Rediff.com gave it 3.5 out of 5 stars calling it "a well-executed thriller". Khalid Mohamed of Hindustan Times gave the film a 3/5 rating calling Abhay Deol "an actor who has matured and radiates intelligence". Times of India gave it a 3/5 rating, calling it "a sparkling gem, off mainstream masala, for the choosy film buff". Rajeev Masand gave the movie 2 out of 5 stars and wrote, "It’s unlikely that Manorama Six Feet Under will appeal to all, mostly because it unfolds at a pace slower than a melting candle. But skillfully directed by debutant Navdeep Singh, the film works as a show reel for the talents of everyone involved."

Score

Track listing 
 "Dhokha" (4:12) - Richa Sharma
 "Dhundla Jo Sama Bandh" (5:04) - Kailash Kher
 "Tere Sawalon Ke" (5:43) - Roop Kumar Rathod, Mahalakshmi Iyer
 "Woh Bheege Pal" (6:49) - Jayesh Gandhi
 "Woh Bheege Pal" (6:48) - Zubeen Garg
 "Woh Bheege Pal" (Remixed by Akbar Sami) (6:18) - Jayesh Gandhi

References

External links
 
 Manorama Six Feet Under on Netflix

2007 films
2010s mystery thriller films
2007 directorial debut films
2000s Hindi-language films
Films shot in Rajasthan
Films shot in Mandawa
Indian mystery thriller films
Indian detective films
Films set in Rajasthan